Livio Spanghero (7 February 1920 – 2 April 2008) was an Italian sailor. He competed in the Firefly event at the 1948 Summer Olympics.

References

External links
 

1920 births
2008 deaths
Italian male sailors (sport)
Olympic sailors of Italy
Sailors at the 1948 Summer Olympics – Firefly
Sportspeople from Friuli-Venezia Giulia